Nathalie Marchino (born July 27, 1981) is a Colombian and a former United States rugby union player.

Biography 
Marchino was born in Colombia, her mother's native country, and grew up in Switzerland, where her father was born. She moved to the United States in 1998, attending high school for two years before entering Siena College in New York. She first played rugby in 2005, joining the Washington D.C. Furies club. After moving to California, she played with the Berkley All Blues club.

Marchino represented the U.S. women's rugby union team at the 2010 and 2014 Women's Rugby World Cup. She also represented the U.S. women's rugby sevens team at the 2013 Rugby World Cup Sevens.

She initially was going to play for the United States at the 2016 Summer Olympics but because of the different eligibility rules between World Rugby and the International Olympic Committee she was not able to because she did not have U.S. citizenship. She was named in Colombia's women's sevens team for the 2016 Summer Olympics.

As of 2016, Marchino was a sales account manager for Twitter.

References

External links 
 
 
 

1981 births
Living people
American female rugby union players
United States women's international rugby union players
Female rugby sevens players
United States international rugby sevens players
Colombia international rugby sevens players
Colombia international women's rugby sevens players
American female rugby sevens players
Olympic rugby sevens players of Colombia
Rugby sevens players at the 2016 Summer Olympics
Siena College alumni
21st-century American women
Sportspeople from Valle del Cauca Department